The Monti procedure is a surgical procedure in which a part of the gastrointestinal tract is used to create a continent conduit between the skin surface and the urinary bladder or a neobladder.

Eponym
The procedure is named after its creator, a Brazilian urologist, Paulo Ricardo Monti.

See also
 Mitrofanoff appendicovesicostomy
 Mitrofanoff principle
 Malone antegrade continence enema

References

Urologic surgery